Kamukuywa is a settlement in Kenya's Bungoma County.

Sources 
 http://www.agapeinaction.com/high_school_blog.html
 http://www.agapeinaction.com/high_school_blog_2013.html

Populated places in Western Province (Kenya)
Bungoma County